Paralecanographa is a genus of lichen-forming fungi in the family Roccellaceae.

References

Roccellaceae
Lichen genera
Arthoniomycetes genera
Taxa described in 2011